Terrie Pickerill is a Democratic political strategist and co-founder and managing partner of SnyderPickerill Media Group, a Chicago-based media firm specializing in the production of political television advertising for state and national political campaigns and candidates.

Career 
Pickerill began her career as a coordinator for the Netsch for Governor campaign in 1994, where she recruited and managed volunteers and helped create and implement the statewide field program. She then worked for the Illinois Comptroller’s office, where she created a comprehensive database for the state’s 7,246 local governments and a paperless filing system, the basis for a system still in use.

Prior to founding SP Media Group with fellow political consultant Ken Snyder, Pickerill was Senior Vice President at AKPD Message and Media (formerly Axelrod and Associates), where she had a leading role in some of the most important political campaigns of her generation, including the election of president Barack Obama.

In 2001, Terrie was chosen as a member of the inaugural class of the Illinois Women’s Institute for Leadership, a program that trains and encourages women to run for office.

Pickerill and Snyder founded SP Media Group in July 2010.  They met while working for David Axelrod on John Schmidt's unsuccessful 1997 gubernatorial campaign, and both cite him as a mentor. Pickerill says Axelrod taught her how to tell a story in a 30-second ad, and the importance of "not being too slick" with ads. Snyder's commercials for Cook County State's Attorney Anita Alvarez were deemed "brilliant" by the Reader's Mick Dumke, and a reason Alvarez, a political unknown, was able to win her race in 2008.

Personal life 

Pickerill resides in Illinois, with her husband and two children.

References 

Year of birth missing (living people)
Living people
People from Oak Park, Illinois
Illinois Democrats